The Elite League Knockout Cup was a speedway Knockout Cup competition in the United Kingdom from 1997 to 2012.

History
It was governed by the Speedway Control Bureau (SCB) in conjunction with the British Speedway Promoters' Association (BSPA). The teams from the top division of league racing, the Elite League, took part. Similar competitions were held for clubs in leagues that preceded the Elite League, including the British League Knockout Cup and the Premier League Knockout Cup.

Rules
This competition was run on the knockout principle; teams drawn together race home and away matches, with the aggregate score deciding the result. In the event of the aggregate score being level, the teams again race home and away.

Winners

See also
Knockout Cup (speedway) for full list of winners and competitions

References

External links
BSPA Website

Speedway competitions in the United Kingdom
Recurring sporting events established in 1965
1997 establishments in the United Kingdom